João de Aquino (23 July 1945 – 28 September 2022) was a Brazilian guitarist and composer. He was a cousin of the famous guitarist Baden Powell de Aquino.

Discography 

 Violão Viageiro (1974)
 Terreiro Grande (1978)
 Asfalto (1980)
 João de Aquino e Maurício Carrilho (1986)
 Patuá (1991)
 Carta Marcada (1994)
 Bordões (1996)

References

External links 
 João de Aquino in the CliqueMusic website 

Brazilian guitarists
Brazilian male guitarists
1945 births
2022 deaths
Brazilian composers